Manganese(II) molybdate is an inorganic compound with the chemical formula MnMoO4. α-MnMoO4 has a monoclinic crystal structure. It is also antiferromagnetic at low temperatures.

Synthesis 
Manganese(II) molybdate can be prepared through a double displacement reaction between sodium molybdate and manganese sulphate:

Manganese(II) molybdate has minimal solubility in water and will form a white-yellow precipitate which turns beige upon being refluxed. The precipitate can then be filtered from solution, which gives the monohydrate (MnMoO4·H2O); heating to 360 °C then provides the anhydrous salt.

Manganese(II) molybdate may also be prepared by heating various manganese oxides and molybdenum trioxide to 700 °C.

Applications 
MnMoO4 has been used as active material in electrodes for aqueous supercapacitors due to fast pseudocapacitive redox reactions, and as catalyst for hydrogen evolution.

References

Manganese(II) compounds
Molybdates